Hispania, the ancient Roman name for the Iberian Peninsula (comprising modern Portugal and Spain), may mean:

Places
Hispania or Iberia
Hispania Citerior, Republican Roman province
Hispania Ulterior, Republican Roman province
Hispania Baetica, Imperial Roman province
Hispania Lusitania, Imperial Roman province
Hispania Tarraconensis, Imperial Roman province
Hispania Balearica, a latter Imperial Roman province
Hispania Carthaginiensis, a latter Imperial Roman province
Hispania Gallaecia, a latter Imperial Roman province
Hispania Nova (disambiguation), a latter designation of two Imperial Roman provinces and a Latinate name for colonial Mexico
Marca Hispanica, buffer zone (795) between the Umayyad Al-Andalus and the Frankish Kingdom
Hispania, Antioquia, town and municipality in Antioquia, Colombia
Hispania, known as Capital mundial de Hispania, 1927 proposed Spanish new capital city replacing Madrid

People
Trajan, Roman Emperor (53-117)
Hadrian, Roman Emperor (76-138)
Theodosius I, Roman Emperor (379-395)
Seneca the Younger, Roman philosopher and playwright, tutor and advisor of Nero (1BC-65AD)
Seneca the Elder,  Roman rhetorician and writer (54BC-39AD)
Hosius of Corduba. Bishop of Corduba (257-359)
Maximus of Hispania, Roman usurper (409-411)

Other
Allegory of Hispania, the national personification of Spain
Hispania, the journal of the American Association of Teachers of Spanish and Portuguese, .
Hispania, revista española de historia, published in Spain by the Consejo Superior de Investigaciones Científicas, .
Hispania Clásica,  classical music concert promotion agency active in Europe and in the Americas
Hispano-Suiza, a car manufacturer
804 Hispania, minor planet orbiting the Sun
, a ferry operated by Swedish Lloyd 1969–1972
, a number of steamship carried this name
Hispania Racing F1 Team, a Formula One team that debuted in the 2010 Formula One season

Derivations
Hispanic, the linguistic group of Spanish speakers
Hispaniola, original Spanish name for the island presently occupied by Haiti and the Dominican Republic

See also
Iberia (disambiguation)
Roman conquest of Hispania
Umayyad conquest of Hispania